Sericomyrmex is a genus of fungus-growing ants in the subfamily Myrmicinae.

Description 
Workers are up to 4 mm long. They are more diurnal than other fungus growers, but also work a little at night. Winged forms were found during July.

Habitat
In young colonies this leads to a small chamber about 15 cm below, which is situated to the right or left of a gallery. When the colony increases new chambers are formed by piercing through the first. Colonies do not exceed 200 individuals, and a nest thus consists of up to three fungus-growing chambers opening into the first one, which is then used as an antechamber, where material brought in by workers is deposited prior to bringing it into the growth chambers, which are about 6 cm in diameter. Small roots growing into them are not cut away but used to hang the gardens on, which resemble a coarse grey sponge.

Scattered throughout this mass are adults, pupae and larvae. White bodies of about .25 mm are strewn thickly upon the surface of the garden, which consist of an aggregation of hyphae with spherical swellings at the end. These bodies, called "Kohlrabi" clumps by Möller, are used for food by the ants. When held in artificial nests, they preferred fruits, especially oranges over other matter like flowers, leaves, and even the organic glue from the back of an old book, which they will all put to use. Of the oranges they take very small particles of the white skin.

Behavior 
The queens appear to mate with only one male during their nuptial flights.

Example species
The nests of S. urichi are most often found in the grass, and can be easily recognized by their peculiar raised entrance. They are always excavated in soil rich in clay, and the cylindrical entrances raise almost 3 cm above the surface.

S. diego from Colombia was found to build a fungus garden about 20 cm below the surface. Workers feign death when encountered. They collect little green vegetable particles resembling an alga, on which they grow their fungus.

S. zacapanus was first found on the clay banks of a small irrigation ditch in an orchard at Zacapa, Guatemala. The nests had small craters of about 6 cm diameter and were covered with the ejected fragments of old fungus substrate.

S. impexus was found in a sandy area at Kartabo, Guyana, to which S. amabilis from Panama is very closely related.

Species

 Sericomyrmex amabilis Wheeler, 1925
 Sericomyrmex aztecus Forel, 1885
 Sericomyrmex beniensis Weber, 1938
 Sericomyrmex bondari Borgmeier, 1937
 Sericomyrmex burchelli Forel, 1905
 Sericomyrmex diego Forel, 1912 — Colombia
 Sericomyrmex harekulli Weber, 1937
 Sericomyrmex impexus Wheeler, 1925 — Guyana
 Sericomyrmex luederwaldti Santschi, 1925
 Sericomyrmex lutzi Wheeler, 1916
 Sericomyrmex maravalhas Ješovnik & Schultz, 2017
 Sericomyrmex mayri Forel, 1912
 Sericomyrmex moreirai Santschi, 1925
 Sericomyrmex myersi Weber, 1937
 Sericomyrmex opacus Mayr, 1865
 Sericomyrmex parvulus Forel, 1912
 Sericomyrmex radioheadi Ješovnik & Schultz, 2017 — Venezuela
 Sericomyrmex saramama Ješovnik & Schultz, 2017
 Sericomyrmex saussurei Emery, 1894
 Sericomyrmex scrobifer Forel, 1911
 Sericomyrmex urichi Forel, 1912
 Sericomyrmex zacapanus Wheeler, 1925 — Guatemala

Footnotes

References

 ITIS: Sericomyrmex species list

Formicinae
Ant genera